Albazinka is a rural locality (a selo) and the administrative center of Albazinsky Selsoviet of Zavitinsky District, Amur Oblast, Russia. The population was 179 as of 2018. There are 10 streets.

Geography 
Albazinka is located on the left bank of the Zavitaya River, 34 km west of Zavitinsk (the district's administrative centre) by road. Platovo is the nearest rural locality.

References 

Rural localities in Zavitinsky District